The 1993 Lipton Championships was a tennis tournament played on Hard courts in Key Biscayne, Florida, United States the event was part of the 1993 ATP Tour and 1993 WTA Tour. The tournament was held from 12 to 21 March 1993.

Arantxa Sánchez Vicario was the defending champion and successfully defended her title, by defeating Steffi Graf 6–4, 3–6, 6–3 in the final.

Seeds
All seeds receive a bye into the second round.

Draw

Finals

Top half

Section 1

Section 2

Section 3

Section 4

Bottom half

Section 5

Section 6

Section 7

Section 8

References

External links
 Official results archive (ITF)
 Official results archive (WTA)

Women's Singles
1993 WTA Tour